USC&GS Ogden was a launch that served as a survey ship in the United States Coast and Geodetic Survey from 1919 to 1944. She was the only Coast and Geodetic Survey ship to bear the name.

Ogden was built by the Canton Lumber Company at Baltimore, Maryland, in 1919.  She entered Coast and Geodetic Survey service that year.

Ogden spent her career on the United States East Coast. She worked as a wire-drag hydrographic survey vessel with the Coast and Geodetic Survey launch USC&GS Marindin.

Ogden was retired from Coast and Geodetic Survey service in 1944.

References
NOAA History, A Science Odyssey: Tools of the Trade: Ships: Coast and Geodetic Survey Ships: Ogden

Ships of the United States Coast and Geodetic Survey
Survey ships of the United States
Ships built in Baltimore
1919 ships